Chris Patrician (born 9 July 1991) is a Canadian bobsledder who competes in the two-man, and four-man events as Breakman and Rightside.

Career
Patrician was recruited to compete in the sport of bobsleigh after finishing his football career at Queens University.

In January 2022, Patrician was named to Canada's 2022 Olympic team.

References

1991 births
Living people
Canadian male bobsledders
Sportspeople from Toronto
Bobsledders at the 2022 Winter Olympics
Olympic bobsledders of Canada